Robert "Bob" O'Leary (January 3, 1951 – December 30, 1993) was an American soccer player who earned one cap with the U.S. national team.  He also spent six seasons in the North American Soccer League and two in the Major Indoor Soccer League.

High school and college
O'Leary attended De Andreis High School.  He then attended Florissant Valley Community College where he was a 1970–1971 junior college All American.  He then transferred to St. Louis University where he played on the men's soccer team.  In 1972, the Billikens won the NCAA championship.

National team
O'Leary earned one cap with the U.S. national team in a 1–0 loss to Poland on August 3, 1973.  He came on at halftime for Emmanuel Georges.

Professional
O'Leary signed with the St. Louis Stars in 1974.  In 1978, the Stars moved to California where it was renamed the California Surf.  He remained with the Surf until he retired in 1979.  In the fall of 1979, he signed with the New York Arrows of Major Indoor Soccer League.  He moved to the St. Louis Steamers for the 1980–1981 season, but played no first-team games.  He retired at the end of the season.

Coaching career
O'Leary began his coaching career as an assistant coach at the University of California, Irvine. He was Head Coach and Director of the Pateadores Soccer Club (Mission Viejo, California) from its inception in 1987.

References

External links
Pateadores Soccer Club
 NASL/MISL stats

1951 births
1993 deaths
Soccer players from St. Louis
American soccer players
California Surf players
Major Indoor Soccer League (1978–1992) players
New York Arrows players
North American Soccer League (1968–1984) players
Saint Louis Billikens men's soccer players
Saint Louis University alumni
St. Louis Stars (soccer) players
St. Louis Steamers (original MISL) players
United States men's international soccer players
Association football midfielders